Moths of the Comoros represent about 320 known moth species. The moths (mostly nocturnal) and butterflies (mostly diurnal) together make up the taxonomic order Lepidoptera.

This is a list of moth species which have been recorded on the Comoros and on Mayotte, which is geographically part of the Comoro Islands off the south-east coast of Africa.

Arctiidae
Amerila vitrea Plötz, 1880
Argina astrea (Drury, 1773)
Chiromachla insulare (Boisduval, 1833)
Chiromachla pallescens Oberthür, 1890
Cyana tripuncta (Toulgoët, 1980)
Detoulgoetia comorensis Rothschild, 1933
Detoulgoetia pseudosparsata Rothschild, 1933
Eilema catenata (Mabille, 1900)
Eilema comorensis Toulgoët, 1955
Eilema humbloti Toulgoët, 1956
Eilema kingdoni (Butler, 1877)
Euchromia folletii (Guérin-Méneville, 1832)
Exilisia insularis Tougoët, 1972
Exilisia leighi (Toulgoët, 1956)
Exilisia quadripunctata (Toulgoët, 1956)
Exilisia variegata Toulgoët, 1972
Fodinoidea pupieri Toulgoët, 1972
Galtara colettae Toulgoët, 1976
Galtara extensa (Butler, 1880)
Leucaloa infragyrea (Saalmüller, 1891)
Mimulosia quadripunctaria (Toulgoët, 1956)
Neuroxena rectilineata (Toulgoët, 1972)
Nyctemera insulare (Boisduval, 1833)
Nyctemera pallescens Oberthür, 1890
Pelosia stictigramma (Hampson, 1908)
Podomachla virgo (Strand, 1909)
Proxhyle comoreana Toulgoët, 1959
Siccia punctipennis (Wallengren, 1860)
Spatulosia griveaudi Toulgoët, 1972
Thumatha fuscescens Walker, 1866
Utetheisa elata (Fabricius, 1798)
Utetheisa pulchella (Linnaeus, 1758)
Viettesia bicolor Toulgoët, 1980
Viettesia matilei Toulgoët, 1978

Carposinidae
Carposina impavida Meyrick, 1913

Copromorphidae
Copromorpha aeruginea Meyrick, 1917
Copromorpha cryptochlora Meyrick, 1930
Copromorpha mesobactra Meyrick, 1930

Crambidae
Agathodes musivalis Guenée, 1854
Agathodes ostentalis (Geyer, 1837)
Ambia prolalis Viette, 1958
Angustalius hapaliscus (Zeller, 1852)
Angustalius malacellus (Duponchel, 1836)
Antigastra catalaunalis (Duponchel, 1833)
Bocchoris putrisalis (Viette, 1958)
Bradina admixtalis (Walker, 1859)
Bradina atralis (Pagenstecher, 1907)
Cadarena sinuata (Fabricius, 1781)
Chabulina putrisalis (Viette, 1958)
Chilo partellus (Swinhoe, 1886)
Chilo sacchariphagus (Bojer, 1856)
Cirrhochrista griveaudalis Viette, 1961
Cnaphalocrocis poeyalis (Boisduval, 1833)
Conotalis nigroradians (Mabille, 1900)
Coptobasoides comoralis Viette, 1960
Coptobasoides djadjoualis Viette, 1981
Cotachena octoguttalis (Felder & Rogenhofer, 1875)
Crocidolomia pavonana (Fabricius, 1794)
Crocidophora caffralis Hampson, 1910
Crocidophora elongalis Viette, 1978
Diaphana indica (Saunders, 1851)
Diaphania oriolalis (Viette, 1958)
Dipleurinodes comorensis Leraut, 1989
Dipleurinodes nigra Leraut, 1989
Epipagis cancellalis (Zeller, 1852)
Euchromius mythus Błeszyński, 1970
Eudipleurina viettei Leraut, 1989
Euphyciodes albotessulalis (Mabille, 1900)
Eurrhyparodes tricoloralis (Zeller, 1852)
Ghesquierellana hirtusalis (Walker, 1859)
Glyphodes boseae Saalmüller, 1880
Glyphodes capensis (Walker, 1866)
Glyphodes mascarenalis de Joannis, 1906
Glyphodes oriolalis (Viette, 1958)
Glyphodes mayottalis  Hampson, 1908
Glyphodes shafferorum Viette, 1987
Glyphodes stolalis Guenée, 1854
Goniorhynchus argyropalis (Hampson, 1908)
Haimbachia leucopleuralis (Mabille, 1900)
Haritalodes derogata (Fabricius, 1775)
Hellula undalis (Fabricius, 1781)
Hendecasis duplifascialis (Hampson, 1891)
Herpetogramma bipunctalis (Fabricius, 1794)
Herpetogramma brunnealis (Hampson, 1913)
Hodebertia testalis (Fabricius, 1794)
Hyalobathra filalis (Guenée, 1854)
Hydriris ornatalis (Duponchel, 1832)
Hymenia perspectalis (Hübner, 1796)
Ischnurges lancinalis (Guenée, 1854)
Isocentris retinalis (Saalmüller, 1880)
Lamprosema argyropalis (Hampson, 1908)
Leucinodes hemichionalis (Mabille, 1900)
Nausinoe capensis (Walker, 1866)
Neurophyseta comoralis (Strand, 1916)
Nomophila noctuella ([Denis & Schiffermüller], 1775)
Notarcha quaternalis (Zeller, 1852)
Omiodes indicata (Fabricius, 1775)
Palpita metallata (Fabricius, 1781)
Palpita vitrealis (Rossi, 1794)
Parapoynx fluctuosalis (Zeller, 1852)
Pardomima zanclophora Martin, 1955
Parotis ankaratralis (Marion, 1954)
Parotis malagasa (Strand, 1912)
Parotis prasinalis (Saalmüller, 1880)
Patissa ochreipalpalis Hampson, 1919
Pioneabathra olesialis (Walker, 1859)
Pleuroptya balteata (Fabricius, 1798)
Pyrausta bouveti Viette, 1981
Pyrausta olesialis (Walker, 1859)
Pyrausta phaenicealis (Hübner, 1818)
Sameodes cancellalis (Zeller, 1852)
Scirpophaga gilviberbis Zeller, 1863
Spoladea recurvalis (Fabricius, 1775)
Stemorrhages sericea (Drury, 1773)
Stenochora lancinalis (Guenée, 1854)
Syllepte melanopalis Hampson, 1908
Syllepte patagialis (Zeller, 1852)
Syllepte undulalis (Pagenstecher, 1907)
Udea ferrugalis (Hübner, 1796)
Ulopeza primalis Viette, 1958
Zebronia phenice (Cramer, 1780)
Zebronia virginalis Viette, 1958

Drepanidae
Archidrepana saturniata Warren, 1902

Elachistidae
Agonopterix nyctalopis (Meyrick, 1930)
Ethmia ampanella Viette, 1976
Ethmia comoriensis Viette, 1963

Euteliidae
Eutelia bouveti Viette, 1984
Eutelia galleyi Viette, 1984
Eutelia verini Viette, 1984

Gelechiidae
Brachmia convolvuli Walsingham, 1907
Dichomeris acuminatus (Staudinger, 1876)

Geometridae
Agathia malgassa Herbulot, 1978
Antitrygodes herbuloti Viette, 1977
Antitrygodes malagasy Viette, 1977
Archichlora ioannis Herbulot, 1954
Ascotis reciprocaria (Walker, 1860)
Ascotis selenaria ([Denis & Schiffermüller], 1775)
Asthenotricha torata L. B. Prout, 1932
Cabera humbloti Herbulot, 1978
Cabera toulgoeti Herbulot, 1956
Chiasmia crassilembaria (Mabille, 1880)
Chiasmia normata (Walker, 1861)
Chiasmia simplicilinea (Pagenstecher, 1907)
Chloroclystis comorana Herbulot, 1978
Chloroclystis consocer Prout, 1937
Chloroclystis grisea Warren, 1897
Chloroclystis nanula (Mabille, 1900)
Chloroclystis taxata Herbulot, 1981
Chloroclystis toreumata L. B. Prout, 1937
Chrysocraspeda erythraria (Mabille, 1893)
Cleora angustivalvis (Herbulot, 1965)
Cleora quadrimaculata (Janse, 1932)
Cleora rothkirchi (Strand, 1914)
Cleora transversaria (Pagenstecher, 1907)
Collix foraminata Guenée, 1858
Colocleora comoraria (Oberthür, 1913)
Comibaena leucochloraria (Mabille, 1880)
Comibaena punctaria (Swinhoe, 1904)
Comostolopsis convalescens Herbulot, 1981
Comostolopsis intensa Prout, 1915
Darisodes orygaria (Guenée, 1862)
Disclisioprocta natalata (Walker, 1862)
Drepanogynis quadrivalvis Herbulot, 1960
Drepanogynis unilineata (Warren, 1897)
Ecpetala nesaea (Prout, 1923)
Epigynopteryx duboisi Herbulot, 1981
Erastria madecassaria (Boisduval, 1833)
Eucrostes disparata Walker, 1861
Eupithecia alticomora Herbulot, 1981
Eupithecia bolespora L. B. Prout, 1937
Eupithecia ericeti Herbulot, 1970
Eupithecia exheres Herbulot, 1954
Gymnoscelis olsoufieffae L. B. Prout, 1937
Gymnoscelis rubricata (de Joannis, 1932)
Heterorachis insueta L. B. Prout, 1922
Horisme albostriata (Pagenstecher, 1907)
Idaea griveaudi Herbulot, 1978
Idaea pulveraria (Snellen, 1872)
Idiochlora approximans (Warren, 1897)
Isturgia catalaunaria (Guenée, 1858)
Isturgia comorensis Krüger, 2001
Isturgia contexta (Saalmüller, 1891)
Isturgia deerraria (Walker, 1861)
Isturgia univirgaria (Mabille, 1880)
Lophorrhachia rubricorpus (Warren, 1898)
Mimoclystia dimorpha Herbulot, 1966
Obolcola retorta Herbulot, 1966
Ochroplutodes hova Herbulot, 1954
Orthonama quadrisecta Herbulot, 1954
Phaiogramma stibolepida (Butler, 1879)
Pingasa griveaudi Herbulot, 1966
Pingasa rhadamaria (Guenée, 1858)
Pingasa ultrata Herbulot, 1966
Problepsis meroearia Saalmüller, 1884
Protosteira spectabilis (Warren, 1899)
Psilocerea ferruginaria (Mabille, 1898)
Psilocerea harmonia Prout, 1932
Psilocerea psegma Herbulot, 1981
Psilocerea russulata (Mabille, 1898)
Racotis deportata Herbulot, 1970
Racotis squalida (Butler, 1878)
Rhodesia alboviridata (Saalmüller, 1880)
Scardamia maculata Warren, 1897
Scopula bistrigata (Pagenstecher, 1907)
Scopula caesaria (Walker, 1861)
Scopula cornishi Prout, 1932
Scopula internataria (Walker, 1861)
Scopula lactaria (Walker, 1861)
Scopula minorata (Boisduval, 1833)
Scopula rebaptisa Herbulot, 1985
Scopula rufolutaria (Mabille, 1900)
Somatina lia Prout, 1915
Somatina vestalis (Butler, 1875)
Terina charmione (Fabricius, 1793)
Thalassodes progressa Prout, 1926
Thalassodes quadraria Guenée, 1857
Traminda obversata (Walker, 1861)
Xanthorhoe incudina Herbulot, 1981
Xenimpia crassipecten Herbulot, 1961
Xenimpia luxuriosa Herbulot, 1961
Xenimpia maculosata (Warren, 1897)
Xenimpia trizonata (Saalmüller, 1891)
Xylopteryx doto Prout, 1925
Zamarada differens Bastelberger, 1907

Immidae
Bryonympha silvana Meyrick, 1930
Imma infima Meyrick, 1930

Lasiocampidae
Phoenicladocera lajonquierei Viette, 1981

Lecithoceridae
Lecithocera malacta Meyrick, 1918
Odites analogica Meyrick, 1917
Odites carcharopa Meyrick, 1914
Odites fructuosa Meyrick, 1915
Odites hermatica Meyrick, 1915
Odites pedicata Meyrick, 1914

Limacodidae
Macrosemyra duberneti Viette, 1980

Lymantriidae
Creagra comorensis Collenette, 1937
Euproctis producta (Walker, 1863)
Euproctis mayottensis Collenette, 1956
Marblepsis mayotta (Collenette, 1931)
Ogoa oberthueri Rothschild, 1916
Olapa tavetensis (Holland, 1892)

Metarbelidae
Salagena ngazidya Viette, 1981

Noctuidae
Achaea catella Guenée, 1852
Achaea diplographa Hampson, 1913
Achaea lienardi (Boisduval, 1833)
Acontia microptera Mabille, 1879
Agrotis ipsilon (Hufnagel, 1766)
Agrotis longidentifera (Hampson, 1903)
Agrotis radama Viette, 1958
Aletia infrargyrea (Saalmüller, 1891)
Aletia pyrausta (Hampson, 1913)
Aletia viettei (Rungs, 1956)
Amyna axis Guenée, 1852
Ancarista laminifera (Saalmüller, 1878)
Anomis alluaudi Viette, 1965
Anomis auragoides (Guenée, 1852)
Anomis flava (Fabricius, 1775)
Anticarsia rubricans (Boisduval, 1833)
Apospasta verini Viette, 1981
Argyrogramma signata (Fabricius, 1775)
Asota borbonica (Boisduval, 1833)
Asota comorana (Aurivillius, 1909)
Asota fereunicolor (Toulgoët, 1972)
Athetis ignava (Guenée, 1852)
Brithys crini (Fabricius, 1775)
Callixena versicolora Saalmüller, 1891
Callopistria maillardi (Guenée, 1862)
Calpoparia imparepunctata (Oberthür, 1890)
Chalciope delta (Boisduval, 1833)
Chasmina malagasy Viette, 1965
Chrysodeixis chalcites (Esper, 1789)
Coelophoris comorensis Viette, 1981
Condica conducta (Walker, 1857)
Condica pauperata (Walker, 1858)
Conservula cinisigna de Joannis, 1906
Conservula malagasa (Gaede, 1915)
Ctenoplusia furcifera (Walker, 1857)
Ctenoplusia limbirena (Guenée, 1852)
Cyligramma fluctuosa (Drury, 1773)
Cyligramma latona (Cramer, 1775)
Digama sagittata Gaede, 1926
Dysgonia angularis (Boisduval, 1833)
Dysgonia subangularis (Mabille, 1890)
Dysgonia torrida (Guenée, 1852)
Entomogramma pardus Guenée, 1852
Erebus walkeri (Butler, 1875)
Ericeia albangula (Saalmüller, 1880)
Ericeia congregata (Walker, 1858)
Ericeia lituraria (Saalmüller, 1880)
Eublemmoides apicimacula (Mabille, 1880)
Eudocima fullonia (Clerck, 1764)
Gracilodes caffra Guenée, 1852
Gracilodes nysa Guenée, 1852
Grammodes bifasciata (Petagna, 1787)
Grammodes stolida (Fabricius, 1775)
Helicoverpa armigera (Hübner, [1808])
Hydrillodes carayoni Viette, 1981
Hypena grandecomorensis Lödl, 1994
Hypena griveaudi Viette, 1968
Hypena obacerralis Walker, [1859]
Hypena ophiusinalis Mabille, 1879
Hypena polycyma Hampson, 1902
Hypena puncticosta Prout, 1921
Hypena neoplyta Prout, 1925
Hypena varialis Walker, 1866
Leucania insulicola Guenée, 1852
Leucania simplaria Saalmüller, 1891
Mabilleana pudens (Mabille, 1900)
Maxera marchalii (Boisduval, 1833)
Megalonycta mediovitta (Rothschild, 1924)
Mentaxya ignicollis (Walker, 1857)
Mocis conveniens (Walker, 1858)
Mocis frugalis (Fabricius, 1775)
Mocis mayeri (Boisduval, 1833)
Mocis proverai Zilli, 2000
Nagia linteola (Guenée, 1852)
Nesaegocera comorana (Jordan, 1926)
Ophiusa finifascia (Walker, 1858)
Ophiusa legendrei Viette, 1967
Plusiopalpa dichora Holland, 1894
Polydesma umbricola Boisduval, 1833
Rhesala moestalis (Walker, 1866)
Sesamia calamistis Hampson, 1910
Simplicia extinctalis (Zeller, 1852)
Spodoptera littoralis (Boisduval, 1833)
Spodoptera mauritia (Boisduval, 1833)
Thysanoplusia indicator (Walker, [1858])
Tolna sypnoides (Butler, 1878)
Tracheplexia galleyi Viette, 1981
Trichoplusia orichalcea (Fabricius, 1775)
Trigonodes hyppasia (Cramer, 1779)

Nolidae
Earias biplaga Walker, 1866
Earias gigas Berio, 1956
Earias insulana (Boisduval, 1833)
Gabala grjebinella (Viette, 1956)
Meganola praefica (Saalmüller, 1884)
Meganola saalmuelleri (Toulgoët, 1961)
Nola biangulata (Toulgoët, 1954)
Pardoxia graellsii (Feisthamel, 1837)

Notodontidae
Malgadonta anjouanica Kiriakoff, 1969
Nesochadisra protea Kiriakoff, 1969

Oecophoridae
Xenophanta ecliptis Meyrick, 1914

Pterophoridae
Exelastis crudipennis (Meyrick, 1932)
Exelastis luqueti (Gibeaux, 1994)
Exelastis phlyctaenias (Meyrick, 1911
Exelastis robinsoni Gibeaux, 1994
Exelastis viettei (Gibeaux, 1994)
Megalorhipida leucodactylus (Fabricius, 1794)
Megalorhipida prolai Gibeaux, 1994
Ochyrotica moheliensis Gibeaux, 1994
Ochyrotica rufa Arenberger, 1987
Platyptilia comorensis Gibeaux, 1994
Stenodacma wahlbergi (Zeller, 1852)
Stenoptilodes taprobanes (Felder & Rogenhofer, 1875)
Titanoptilus laniger Bigot, 1969
Walsinghamiella prolai (Gibeaux, 1994)

Pyralidae
Canthelea oegnusalis (Walker, 1859)
Endotricha vinolentalis Ragonot, 1891
Epicrocis oegnusalis (Walker, 1859)
Etiella zinckenella (Treitschke, 1832)
Goateria mayottensis Leraut, 2010
Macalla seyrigalis Marion & Viette, 1956
Maliarpha separatella (Ragonot, 1888)
Marionana paulianalis Viette, 1953
Nhoabe privatalis Viette, 1960
Sindris sganzini Boisduval, 1833

Saturniidae
Antherina suraka (Boisduval, 1833)

Sphingidae
Acherontia atropos (Linnaeus, 1758)
Agrius convolvuli (Linnaeus, 1758)
Basiothia medea (Fabricius, 1781)
Batocnema coquerelii (Boisduval, 1875)
Cephonodes hylas (Linnaeus, 1771)
Coelonia fulvinotata (Butler, 1875)
Coelonia solani (Boisduval, 1833)
Daphnis nerii (Linnaeus, 1758)
Dargeclanis grandidieri (Mabille, 1879)
Euchloron megaera (Linnaeus, 1758)
Hippotion celerio (Linnaeus, 1758)
Hippotion eson (Cramer, 1779)
Hippotion geryon (Boisduval, 1875)
Maassenia heydeni (Saalmüller, 1878)
Macroglossum aesalon Mabille, 1879
Macroglossum trochilus (Hübner, 1823)
Nephele accentifera (Palisot de Beauvois, 1821)
Nephele comoroana Clark, 1923
Nephele densoi (Keferstein, 1870)
Nephele oenopion (Hübner, [1824])
Pseudoclanis grandidieri (Mabille, 1879)
Temnora fumosa (Walker, 1856)
Temnora leighi Rothschild & Jordan, 1915
Temnora marginata (Walker, 1856)
Temnora peckoveri (Butler, 1876)
Temnora pseudopylas (Rothschild, 1894)
Theretra orpheus (Herrich-Schäffer, 1854)
Xanthopan morganii (Walker, 1856)

Thyrididae
Hapana carcealis Whalley, 1971
Rhodoneura opalinula (Mabille, 1879)
Rhodoneura sordidula (Plötz, 1880)
Rhodoneura zophocrana Viette, 1957

Tineidae
Cimitra fetialis (Meyrick, 1917)
Cimitra horridella (Walker, 1863)
Dasyses rugosella (Stainton, 1859)
Scalidomia fetialis (Meyrick, 1917)
Silosca comorensis Gozmány, 1968
Tiquadra goochii Walsingham, 1881

Tortricidae
Bactra sinassula Diakonoff, 1963
Bactra stagnicolana Zeller, 1852
Brachiolia amblopis (Meyrick, 1911)
Brachiolia egenella (Walker, 1864)
Coniostola stereoma (Meyrick, 1912)
Cosmorrhyncha ocellata (Mabille, 1900)
Cryptaspasma zigzag Diakonoff, 1983
Cryptophlebia aphos Diakonoff, 1983
Cryptophlebia hemon Diakonoff, 1983
Eccopsis encardia Diakonoff, 1983
Eccopsis heterodon Diakonoff, 1981
Eccopsis wahlbergiana Zeller, 1852
Hopliteccopsis maura Diakonoff, 1983
Megaherpystis agmatophora Diakonoff, 1989
Megalomacha tigripes Diakonoff, 1960
Procrica agrapha Diakonoff, 1983
Procrica diarda Diakonoff, 1983
Procrica intrepida (Meyrick, 1912)
Procrica sanidota (Meyrick, 1912)
Thylacandra endotera Diakonoff, 1983
Thylacandra melanotoma Diakonoff, 1983

Uraniidae
Dirades comoroana Boudinot, 1982
Dirades theclata (Guenée, 1858)
Epiplema fletcheri Boudinot, 1982
Epiplema illineata Warren, 1899
Epiplema viettei Boudinot, 1982

Xyloryctidae
Eretmocera laetissima Zeller, 1852

References

Moths
Comoros
Comoros
Moths